Kamil Majkowski (born 4 February 1989, in Maków Mazowiecki) is a Polish football forward.

Career

Club
He spent the first half of 2008-09 on loan at Wisła Płock. In the Summer 2009, he was loaned to Znicz Pruszków on a one-year deal.

In February 2011, he was loaned to Pogoń Szczecin on a half-year deal. In July 2011, he was loaned to Zawisza Bydgoszcz.

On 19 January 2017, Majkowski signed one and a half year contract with III liga club Motor Lublin.

International
He was a part of Poland national under-19 football team.

References

External links 
 

1989 births
Living people
Polish footballers
Legia Warsaw II players
Legia Warsaw players
Wisła Płock players
Znicz Pruszków players
Pogoń Szczecin players
Zawisza Bydgoszcz players
Sandecja Nowy Sącz players
Motor Lublin players
People from Maków County
Sportspeople from Masovian Voivodeship
Association football forwards